The 2015 Sprint Unlimited at Daytona was a NASCAR Sprint Cup Series stock car race held on February 14, 2015, at Daytona International Speedway in Daytona Beach, Florida. Contested over 75 laps, it was the first exhibition race of the 2015 NASCAR Sprint Cup Series season. Matt Kenseth took the victory ahead of Martin Truex Jr. Carl Edwards, Casey Mears, and Kyle Larson rounded out the top five.

Report

Background

The track, Daytona International Speedway, is one of six superspeedways to hold NASCAR races, the others being Michigan International Speedway, Auto Club Speedway, Indianapolis Motor Speedway, Pocono Raceway and Talladega Superspeedway. The track's turns are banked at 31 degrees, while the front stretch, the location of the finish line, is banked at 18 degrees. Denny Hamlin was the defending race winner.

Format and eligibility
The race is 75 laps in length, and was divided into two segments; the first was 25 laps and the second was 50 laps. The race was open to those drivers who won a pole in the 2014 season or had won the Sprint Unlimited previously. Two new changes were announced in December. The field was expanded to those who have won the pole for the Daytona 500 previously and/or were in the Chase in 2014.

Entry list
The entry list for the Sprint Unlimited was released on December 17, 2014. Twenty-five drivers were eligible for the race.

Starting lineup
The starting lineup was determined by a random draw. Paul Menard drew the top spot.

Practice

First practice
Tony Stewart was called to the NASCAR hauler for ignoring the black flag which was shown to him, as he did not weigh in before the session. Per NASCAR regulations, all drivers had to weigh in before the start of the season to calculate the minimum car weights. This was normally done during January Preseason Thunder, but it was canceled in 2015. Stewart took to Twitter to express his frustration upon exiting his car.

Final practice

Race

First segment
The race started at 8:35 p.m. Eastern time with Paul Menard leading the field to the green. With a push from Matt Kenseth on the inside lane, Brad Keselowski took the lead on lap nine. Kenseth jumped to the outside lane to pass Keselowski for the lead on lap eleven, before Martin Truex Jr. utilized a slingshot move to pass Kenseth for the lead the next lap. Kenseth used a push on the bottom to retake the lead on lap 15 but could not maintain the lead as he fell back and handed Truex Jr. the lead. The first caution of the race flew on lap 22 for a single car wreck on the front stretch. Coming to the start-finish line, Kyle Larson made contact with Brad Keselowski, while trying to merge into the top lane of cars. When Keselowski tried to correct it, he destroyed his car's splitter when it dug into the grass. He turned back onto the track and hit the wall. Austin Dillon rear-ended Kyle Busch trying to avoid Keselowski.

Second segment

The Big One
As the caution came out three laps before the scheduled end of the first segment, NASCAR counted this caution as the competition caution. Upon exiting his car, Keselowski told reporters that he had made contact with Larson and teammate Joey Logano and that he "couldn't tell if someone made contact with me from behind". Keselowski also described the crash as "just part of racing at Daytona" and that his team would "be ready to go when it counts in the [Daytona] 500". Jamie McMurray earned the dubious honor of being the first driver penalized under NASCAR's new pit road monitoring system, as his pit crew was found to be over the wall too soon. Ryan Newman was also penalized for driving through too many pit boxes before reaching his own. The race restarted on lap 30, with Dale Earnhardt Jr. at the head of the race. Truex Jr. ducked underneath Earnhardt Jr. to take back the lead on lap 41, before the second caution of the race flew on lap 45 for The Big One, involving twelve cars. Greg Biffle got into the back of Jamie McMurray enough to turn him; McMurray overcorrected and turned back onto the tri-oval. Aric Almirola, Clint Bowyer, Kurt Busch, Kyle Busch, defending race winner Denny Hamlin, Kevin Harvick, Jimmie Johnson, Kasey Kahne, McMurray, Paul Menard, Ricky Stenhouse Jr. and Tony Stewart were all taken out or sustained damage in the crash. McMurray stated that Biffle has "got me loose a couple of times before" but that it was customary for Daytona racing, adding that "you're fighting for every position every lap and he just got into me a little too hard off four and I couldn't hang on to it". Bowyer – having been involved in the crash after his car was hit by Menard – told reporters that he saw a car backwards and became involved in the wreck. Bowyer added that the cars "don't seem to like to go through the grass very well" and that he was "just starting to have some fun and get up through them". This necessitated the race being red flagged for almost 15 minutes; teams were allowed to work on their cars, as the Sprint Unlimited was a non-points race.

Final laps
The race restarted with 27 laps to go. Kenseth dive bombed around Truex to take back the lead with 19 laps to go, before the third caution of the race flew with 14 laps to go after Stenhouse Jr. spun out in turn 3 and took out three other cars with him. The race restarted with nine laps to go, before the fourth caution of the race flew with seven laps to go after Stewart got loose exiting turn 2 and collected Biffle, who hit the inside retaining wall in a manner similar to Danica Patrick in the 2012 Gatorade Duels. Kurt Busch was also taken out in this wreck. The red flag was displayed a second time; after a five-minute delay, Kenseth held off the field until the end of the race, to win ahead of Truex Jr. and Carl Edwards. Only 12 of the race's 25 starters were running at the finish of the event. Kenseth described his victory as "great to win at Daytona anytime" and "a great way to start off the year". Truex Jr. stated that his runner-up finish was the "most fun I have had in a race car in a long, long time".

Post-race
Following the race, Kevin Harvick confronted Joey Logano on pit road after Logano pushed him into the wall with two laps to go. One of Logano's crew members pulled him away from Harvick to prevent the argument from escalating. Harvick stated that "you can't just drive somebody straight in the corner into the fence" and that Logano "kind of did the same thing to me at Talladega". Logano referred to Harvick as "an instigator" and that the incident was "the same old crap". Danica Patrick also seemed to be upset with Logano after the race, but he did not understand why.

Race results

Media

Television

Radio

See also
2015 Budweiser Duels, held on February 19
2015 Daytona 500, held on February 22

References

Sprint Unlimited
Sprint Unlimited
NASCAR races at Daytona International Speedway